Huis Marseille, Museum for Photography is the oldest photography museum in Amsterdam, opened in 1999. Huis Marseille was the first photography museum in the Netherlands when it opened in 1999; the Nederlands Fotomuseum in Rotterdam, the Fotomuseum Den Haag in The Hague, and FOAM in a nearby building have opened since. The museum is housed in a residence built around 1665 for a French merchant, and contains 13 exhibition spaces and a restored room in Louis XIV style; the building was restored and the museum extended into the adjacent building in 2007–2013.

Exhibitions generally use the entire space and have mostly featured documentary photography. They have included Rob Hornstra's Sochi Project, photographs of Kyoto by Jacqueline Hassink, Sarkis' Ring Portraits, work by Juul Kraijer, and various photographers' works portraying dance.

The houses
The museum Huis Marseille takes its name from the building in which it is housed. This monumental residence was built around 1665 for the French merchant Isaac Focquier. To its classicist facade Focquier added a stone tablet depicting a map of the French seaport Marseille. Three hundred years later, the original seventeenth-century layout of the house—consisting of a 'front' segment, a courtyard, a 'back' segment and garden—is still largely intact.

In September 2013, the museum was expanded to include the neighboring building at Keizersgracht 399, providing it with a total of fourteen exhibition spaces. In addition, the museum has a photography library and a garden with a garden house.

Exhibitions
Some of the exhibitions that have taken place at Huis Marseille:

 David Goldblatt: Intersections (2007)
 Jacqueline Hassink: The Power Show (2007)
 Edward Burtynsky: Oil (2009)
 Digitaal? Analoog! met fotoveiling ten bate van fotografielaboratorium Aap-lab (2010)
 First Light: Fotografie & Astronomie (2010)
 Scarlett Hooft Graafland: Soft Horizons (2011)
 Yasusuke Ota: The Abandoned Animals of Fukushima (2012)
 Viviane Sassen: In and out of fashion (2012)
 Rob Hornstra: Gouden jaren (2013)
 Apartheid & After (2014)
 Taco Anema: In Conference. Portraits of Dutch Administrative Boards (2014)
 Cor Jaring: Cor was hier (2015)
 Stephan Shore: Retrospective (2016)
 Dana Lixenberg: Imperial Courts (2016)
 Eddo Hartmann: Setting the Stage: Pyongyang, North Korea, Part 2
 Jeff Cowen: Photoworks (2017)
 Jamie Hawkesworth: Landscape with Tree (2017)
 Joscha Steffens: Teen Spirit Island
 Harold Strak & Willem van Zoetendaal: Amsterdam Stuff (2018)
 Helga Paris, Céline van Balen, Esther Kroon & Julie Greve: Futures Past & Present (2019)
 Berenice Abbott: Portraits of Modernity (2019)
 Elspeth Diederix: When Red Disappears (2019)
 Deana Lawson (2019)
 Jean-Luc Mylayne: The Autumn of Paradise (2020)
 Farah Al Qasimi, Frida Orupabo, Coco Capitán, Myriam Boulos: Infinite Identities (2020)
 Vincent Delbrouck: Champú (2021)
 Sohrab Hura: Spill (2021)
 Luc Delahaye: Le Village (2021)
 Charlotte Dumas: Ao (2021)
 Lindokuhle Sobekwa: Umkhondo. Tracing memory (2022)
 Dana Lixenberg: Polaroid 54/59/79 (2022)
 Sabelo Mlangeni: Isivumelwano (2022)
 Dirk Kome: Vijf lange meden (2022)
 Jochen Lempert: Natural sources (2022)
 Nhu Xuan Hua: Hug of a swan (2022)

References

Photography museums and galleries in the Netherlands